The Cycles: International Grand Prix Racing is a 1989 computer game developed by Distinctive Software and published by Accolade. It has similarities to Grand Prix Circuit, except it is a motorcycle racing sim. The game includes all the tracks of 1989 Grand Prix motorcycle racing season. Laguna Seca and Goiania circuits are not available when you choose 125cc bike.

It was released for the Amiga, Commodore 64, MS-DOS, Amstrad CPC and ZX Spectrum.

Gameplay
More like a simulation than an arcade game, unlike Sega's Hang-On and Super Hang-On, the player has no time limit to clear races. If the player crashes, they are out of the race. To win each race, the player must get through the finish lines. The player can change the number of laps for a race.

The game has several modes which it can be played in:

Championship: Choose a bike, not a track. If the player is qualified for race, they can proceed to it.
Practice: The player chooses their bike and track.
Single Race: Player chooses a bike and track. If the player is qualified for race, they can proceed to it.

External links

1989 video games
Accolade (company) games
Amiga games
Commodore 64 games
DOS games
Amstrad CPC games
ZX Spectrum games
Racing video games
Video games developed in Canada
Distinctive Software games
Single-player video games